Air Ambulance Show is an international fair of integrated emergency systems for professionals and general public. The fair takes place every year in May in Hradec Králové in the Czech Republic.

See also
 Air ambulance

External links
  Official pages

Air Ambulance Show
Aviation in the Czech Republic
Hradec Králové